Naniruvude Ninagagi is a 1979 Indian Kannada-language film, directed by A. V. Seshagiri Rao Rao and produced by R. V. Gurupada. The film stars Vishnuvardhan, Aarathi, Deepa and Balakrishna. The film has musical score by Rajan–Nagendra.

Cast

Vishnuvardhan
Aarathi
Deepa 
Balakrishna
Dwarkish
Dinesh
Musuri Krishnamurthy
Sundar Krishna Urs
Leelavathi
Pramila Joshai
Shanthala
Sathish
Hanumanthachar
Tiger Prabhakar
Chandrahas
Bheema Raj
Rajkumar
Dr. Natarajan
Papamma
Lalithamma
Geetha
Sharadamma
Revathi
Thipatur Siddaramaiah
Police Mahadevappa
G. S. Vasu

Soundtrack
The music was composed by Rajan–Nagendra.

References

External links
 

1979 films
1970s Kannada-language films
Films scored by Rajan–Nagendra
Films directed by A. V. Seshagiri Rao